Muhammad Fauzi bin Abdul Kadar (born 28 July 1992) is a Malaysian footballer who plays for Ultimate in Malaysia M3 League as a winger.

Career statistics

Club

References

External links 
 

Living people
Malaysian footballers
Association football defenders
1992 births
Terengganu FC players